Live 2013 may refer to:

 Live 2013 EP, a 2013 EP by Nine Inch Nails 
 Céline une seule fois / Live 2013, a 2014 album by Celine Dion
 Trilogia 1983–1989 live 2013, a 2013 album by Litfiba
 Time: Live Tour 2013, a concert tour by Tohoshinki